Else Marie Sofie Schmitt (May 2, 1921 in Brühl, Germany – March 22, 1995 in Cologne, Germany) was a German politician of the Social Democratic Party of Germany. She served  as member of city council of Cologne (1961–1984) as well as the first female deputy mayor (1969–1975) of the city. 
Schmitt was a member of the Parteirat of her party in the 1970s and contributed substantially to policy changes regarding abortion law (Paragraph 218) policy and Paragraph 175 of her federal ruling party.

The "Bundesverdienstkreuz" was awarded to her in two different classes - 1974 and 1986.

References

Literature
 Thomas Deres: Die Fraktion beschließt einstimmig, Emons (January 1999).

External links
 

1921 births
1995 deaths
Officers Crosses of the Order of Merit of the Federal Republic of Germany
Politicians from Cologne
Social Democratic Party of Germany politicians
German city councillors
20th-century German women politicians
People from Brühl (Rhineland)